The 1975 1. divisjon was the 31st completed season of top division football in Norway.

Overview
It was contested by 12 teams, and Viking FK won the championship, their fourth consecutive league title and their fifth top-flight title overall.

Teams and locations
''Note: Table lists in alphabetical order.

League table

Results

Season statistics

Top scorer
 Arne Dokken, Lillestrøm – 18 goals

Attendances

References
Norway - List of final tables (RSSSF)
Norsk internasjonal fotballstatistikk (NIFS)

Eliteserien seasons
Norway
Norway
1